ETX, standing for Embedded Technology eXtended, is an integrated and compact  computer-on-module (COM) form factor, which can be used in a design application much like an integrated circuit component.  Each ETX COM integrates core CPU and memory functionality, the common I/O of a PC/AT (serial, parallel, etc.), USB, audio, graphics, and Ethernet. All I/O signals as well as a full implementation of ISA and PCI buses are mapped to four high-density, low-profile connectors on the bottom side of the module.

ETX boards are available with AMD Geode, VIA, Intel Atom, Pentium, Celeron and Core Duo processors.

XTX offers a 75% pin-compatible upgrade path to ETX standard. XTX drops the ISA bus and adds PCI-Express, SATA, and LPC.

COM Express was released in 2005 from PICMG.

History
The Embedded Technology eXtended (ETX) specification, first developed by Kontron (formerly *JUMPtec) in early 2000.

In April 2006, the members of the ETX Industrial Group released the next generation of the ETX 3.0 specification. The ETX Industrial Group is an independent association of companies that work to exchange knowledge about ETX. Membership is open to companies which develop and produce ETX modules. Members include Kontron Embedded Modules GmbH, congatec AG, Advantech, MSC Vertriebs GmbH,  ADLINK Technology Inc., Avalue Technology Inc., SECO Srl, Arbor Technology Corp., Axiomtek Co., Blue Chip Technology, AAEON Technology Inc., AEWIN Technologies IBase, Honeywell – CMSS and Portwell.

3.0 specification
The ETX 3.0 Specification is compact form factor,  95 × 114 mm (3.7 × 4.4 inches) in size. It extends the original ETX standard and adds two Serial ATA (SATA) interfaces. This is done without changing any of the ETX pin designations, making new modules pin-to-pin compatible with previous versions. 

Modules designed according to the ETX 3.0 specification integrate two SATA ports via two slim line connectors designed onto the top side of the CPU Module in the vicinity of X4. The module or carrier board ETX connectors do not require any changes to use the faster SATA hard drives.

Mandatory features:
 Connector X1: PCI bus, USB Audio
 Connector X2: ISA BUS
 Connector X3: VGA, LCD, Video, COM 1, COM2, LPT/Floppy, IrDA, Mouse, Keyboard
 Connector X4: IDE 1, IDE 2, Ethernet, miscellaneous
 SATA: Two ports via connector on the top side (as of version 3.0)

External links

 ETX Specification V3.02
 ETX Design Guide
 ETX 3.0: SATA integration overview - PC/104 and Small Form Factors

Motherboard form factors
Computer hardware standards